Mohammad Javed Patwary was a Bangladeshi police officer and a former Inspector General of Police of Bangladesh Police . Earlier, he served as Additional Inspector General of Police Special Branch (SB). After his retirement in 2020, he was appointed as the ambassador to Saudi Arabia by the Government of Bangladesh.

Early life and education 
Patwary was born on 15 April 1961 and grew up in Mandary Village, Sadar upazila, Chandpur district. He completed his SSC and HSC from Baburhat high school and Chandpur Govt. College respectively. He earned his bachelor's and master's in social welfare from the University of Dhaka.  He obtained his PhD from the Jahangirnagar University under the Public Administration department. His research topic was "Combating Terrorism in Bangladesh: Challenges and Prospects".

Career 
Patwary then joined Bangladesh Police as an Assistant Superintendent of Police in 1986 and awarded first merit position in the 6th Bangladesh Civil Service (BCS).

Patwary had served in the United Nations Confidence Restoration Operation in Croatia, United Nations Mission in Sierra Leone, United Nations Interim Administration Mission in Kosovo, and United Nations Mission in South Sudan.

On 26 January 2018, Patwary had been appointed as 28th Inspector General of Police of Bangladesh police. He was serving as the additional inspector general  and chief of the Special Branch. During his time at the Special Branch he collected documents for The Prison Diaries of Sheikh Mujibur Rahman which had pleased Rahman's family members including Prime Minister Sheikh Hasina. He preserved documents of Sheikh Mujibur Rahman in the archies of the Special Branch.

Patwary is a guest lecturer at the Social Welfare and Research Institute and the Department of Criminology at the University of Dhaka. He described the 2018 Bangladesh general election as "peaceful". He was the president of the Bangladesh Kabaddi Federation.

Patwary  retired from police with effect from 15 April 2020. He was replaced by Benazir Ahmed, Director General of Rapid Action Battalion. On 29 June 2020, he was appointed the ambassador of Bangladesh to Saudi Arabia on a three year contract. He replaced Golam Moshi, leader of Jatiya Party, as ambassador.

References

Living people
People from Chandpur District
University of Dhaka alumni
Jahangirnagar University alumni
Inspectors General of Police (Bangladesh)
Bangladeshi police chiefs
Bangladeshi police officers
Ambassadors of Bangladesh to Saudi Arabia
Criminal Investigation Department (Bangladesh) officers
1961 births